Sixto Rafael Vizuete Toapanta (born January 13, 1961) is the Ecuadorian football manager.

Early career
He played for Deportivo Cotopaxi which at that time was promoted to the first division in Ecuador. After his footballing career, he attended University of Leipzig.

Coaching career
From 1992 to 1995 he was in charge of many small local sides in Ecuador, until he began to coach the youth ranks of Club Deportivo ESPOLI of Quito in 1996. He made a change however when the Federación Ecuatoriana de Fútbol designated him the coach of the Ecuador U-17 side. Failing to qualify for the 2007 U-17 World Cup, he made up for it by giving Ecuador their first title in their footballing history: they defeated Jamaica in the final of the 2007 Pan American Games to win the gold medal.

Ecuador national team
He was appointed interim coach of the Ecuador national team on November 18, 2007 following Luis Fernando Suarez's irrevocable decision to resign. At that time, Ecuador had lost all three of their 2010 World Cup qualifiers which prompted Suarez's resignation. Vizuete gave Ecuador their first qualifying win in his first match as manager, thumping rivals Peru 5-1. This caused the majority of Ecuadorians to trust him, and on 26 February 2008, he was appointed official coach of the national side. Ecuador played its first game with Vizuete as head coach on 26 March 2008 against Haiti, defeating them 3-1.On October 15, 2009, Chile defeated Ecuador in World Cup Qualifying for South Africa 2010 1-0 under Vizuete, Ecuador didn't qualify. But, on February 12, 2011, Vizuete qualified Ecuador's U-20 national team to the Fifa U-20 World cup in Colombia this summer.

El Nacional
In April 2012, Vizuete was named the manager of Ecuadorian-club El Nacional after the departure of Mario Saralegui the day before.

References

External links
 Sixto Vizuete profile on Ecuador Federation official site 
 Sixto Vizuete at Footballdatabase

1961 births
Living people
People from Latacunga Canton
Ecuadorian footballers
Ecuadorian football managers
Ecuador national football team managers
C.D. El Nacional managers
Pan American Games gold medalists for Ecuador
Pan American Games medalists in football
Association footballers not categorized by position
Footballers at the 2007 Pan American Games
Medalists at the 2007 Pan American Games
Mushuc Runa S.C. managers
S.D. Quito managers
Imbabura S.C. managers